This article lists the Northern Ireland Labour Party's election results in UK parliamentary elections.  Except where noted, candidates were endorsed by the British Labour Party.

Summary of general election performance

Election results

1923 general election

Midgley contested the election for the Belfast Labour Party, forerunner of the Northern Ireland Labour Party

1924 general election

Midgley was not endorsed by the British Labour Party.

1931 general election

By-elections, 1935–1945

1945 general election

By-elections, 1945–1950

1950 general election

1951 general election

By-elections, 1951–1955

1955 general election

By-elections, 1955–1959

1959 general election

By-elections, 1959–1964

1964 general election

1966 general election

1970 general election

February 1974 general election

October 1974 general election

1979 general election

References

F. W. S. Craig, Chronology of British Parliamentary By-elections 1833-1987
UK General election results February 1974, Richard Kimber's Political Resources
UK General election results October 1974, Richard Kimber's Political Resources
UK General election results May 1979, Richard Kimber's Political Resources

Northern Ireland Labour Party
Election results by party in the United Kingdom